Robin Green is an American politician currently serving as a member of the Connecticut House of Representatives from the 55th district, which includes the towns of Andover, Bolton, Hebron, and Marlborough, since 2017. Green was first elected to the office in 2016, when she ran unopposed. Green was re-elected in 2018, when she beat Democrat Tiffany Thiele, and again in 2020, when she beat Democrat John Collins. In January 2022, Green announced that she did not intend to seek re-election in the upcoming 2022 elections.

References

Republican Party members of the Connecticut House of Representatives
Springfield College (Massachusetts) alumni
Living people
Year of birth missing (living people)